Thomas Conolly (Leixlip Castle, 1738 – 27 April 1803 Celbridge) was an Irish landowner and Member of Parliament.

Early life

Conolly was the son and heir of William James Conolly (d. 1754) of Castletown House, County Kildare, Ireland, by his wife Lady Anne Wentworth, daughter of Thomas Wentworth, 1st Earl of Strafford (1672–1739). In 1758 he married Lady Louisa Lennox, a daughter of Charles Lennox, 2nd Duke of Richmond, but had no children.

Career
Conolly sat in the Parliament of Great Britain for Malmesbury from 1759 to 1768 and for Chichester from 1768 to 1780. In 1761 he was elected to the Parliament of Ireland for Ballyshannon and for County Londonderry, sitting for the latter constituency until May 1800. On 6 April 1761 he was appointed to the Privy Council of Ireland. In Dublin, Conolly was a member of the Kildare Street Club.

Property

Wentworth Castle
In 1802 Conolly was left Wentworth Castle by his second cousin Augusta Anne Hatfield-Kaye, sister of Frederick Wentworth, 3rd Earl of Strafford. On his death Wentworth Castle was inherited by Frederick Thomas William Vernon, grandson of the 1st Earl of Strafford's daughter Harriet Wentworth.

Castletown House
Castletown House passed to his widow Lady Louisa and then to Edward Pakenham, grandson of Conolly's sister Harriet Conolly, and was sold by William Conolly-Carew, 6th Baron Carew, in 1965.

Cliff House
The Conolly summer residence 'Cliff House' on the banks of the River Erne between Belleek, County Fermanagh and Ballyshannon County Donegal was demolished as part of the Erne Hydroelectric scheme, which constructed the Cliff and Cathaleen's Fall hydroelectric power stations. Cliff hydroelectric power station was constructed on the site of 'Cliff House' and was commissioned in 1950.

5, St James's Square
Wentworth House, 5, St James's Square, Conolly's London townhouse, built by his uncle William Wentworth, 2nd Earl of Strafford (1722–1791), became the property of his nephew George Byng (1764–1847), the son of his sister Anne Conolly, whose younger brother was Field Marshal John Byng, 1st Earl of Strafford (1772-1860), elevated to the peerage in 1847 with the same territorial designation as the earldom of his maternal cousins, which earldom had become extinct in 1799.

References

1738 births
1803 deaths
Politicians from County Kildare
19th-century Irish people
British MPs 1754–1761
British MPs 1761–1768
British MPs 1768–1774
British MPs 1774–1780
Members of the Parliament of Great Britain for English constituencies
Members of the Privy Council of Ireland
Irish MPs 1761–1768
Irish MPs 1769–1776
Irish MPs 1776–1783
Irish MPs 1783–1790
Irish MPs 1790–1797
Irish MPs 1798–1800
Members of the Parliament of Ireland (pre-1801) for County Donegal constituencies
Members of the Parliament of Ireland (pre-1801) for County Londonderry constituencies